Islantilla is a seaside town located next to La Antilla, between the municipalities of Lepe and Isla Cristina, in Andalusia, Spain. Islantilla belongs to a tourist region called "Costa  de la Luz".  Huelva is an urban center close to Islantilla. Islantilla attracts thousands of tourists per year and is known to be one of the most beautiful beach towns in Spain. 

Populated places in the Province of Huelva